Mahamandaleshwar (or Maha Mandaleshwar) is a title used by some Hindu monks of the Dashanami order of swamis, founded by Shankaracharya. The world Mahamandaleshwar means "superior of great and/or numerous monasteries" or "superior of a religious district or province"; the title implies a great spiritual leader.

In 2019, nine foreigners were given the title mahamandaleshwar for the first time at the Kumbh Mela.

See also
 Mahant

References

Titles and occupations in Hinduism